José Ollarves (born 5 May 1953) is a Venezuelan former cyclist. He competed in the individual road race and team time trial events at the 1976 Summer Olympics.

References

External links
 

1953 births
Living people
Venezuelan male cyclists
Olympic cyclists of Venezuela
Cyclists at the 1976 Summer Olympics
Place of birth missing (living people)
20th-century Venezuelan people